The Warmer in the Winter Christmas Tour is a 2019 North American concert tour by American violinist Lindsey Stirling.  This was her third Christmas tour, celebrating her album Warmer in the Winter.

Background
In 2017, Stirling released the Christmas album Warmer in the Winter and toured that December.  She repeated the Christmas theme in 2018 with her Wanderland Tour.  Ahead of this tour, Stirling noted in an interview how her fans encouraged her to make this an annual event.

The 2019 Warmer in the Winter Christmas Tour was a 26-date concert tour across North America. It began in Fresno, California, on 19 November and concluded on December 23 in Fort Myers, Florida.

Set list
The following set list is representative of the show in Fort Lauderdale, Florida, on December 21, 2019. It is not representative of all concerts for the duration of the tour.

 "All I Want for Christmas Is You"
 "Christmas C'Mon"
 "Let It Snow! Let It Snow! Let It Snow!"
 "Warmer in the Winter"
 "Jingle Bell Rock"
 "I Saw Three Ships/ God Rest 'Ye Merry Gentlemen"
 "Jingle Bells / Deck the Halls / It's Beginning to Look Like Christmas / Grandma Got Ran Over by a Reindeer / Hedwig's Theme / Feliz Navidad / The Devil Went Down to Georgia"
 "Hallelujah"
 "Angels We Have Heard on High"
 "Crystallize"
 "Between Twilight"
 "Dance of the Sugar Plum Fairy"
 "Santa Baby"
 "Feeling Good"
 "We Three Gentlemen"
 "Carol of the Bells"
 "You're a Mean One, Mr. Grinch"

 Encore
 "I Wonder as I Wander"

Reception
Music Connection wrote positively about her stop in Rochester, citing the mixture of songs, quality of dancing and the fun elements of the show.

Tour dates

Personnel
Band
 Lindsey Stirling – violin
 Drew Steen – drums

References

External links
Official website
Warmer In The Winter Christmas Tour Promotional Video

2019 concert tours
Lindsey Stirling concert tours